Lee Poh Ping (1 April 1942 – 21 November 2016) was a Malaysian professor and political scientist. He is known for his work in international relations, contributions to the development of Japanese studies in Malaysia, and fostering networks of scholars in the country.

Early life 
Lee was born in Ipoh, Perak where he attended the Anglo-Chinese School. After obtaining his Senior Cambridge in 1958, he underwent training for two years at the Malayan Teacher Training College in Brinsford Lodge, Wolverhampton, subsequently becoming a teacher upon his return to Ipoh.

Education 
In 1967, Lee received a first class B.A in History from the University of Malaya. In 1974, Lee received a PhD in Government from Cornell University where he studied under Benedict Anderson.

Career 
Lee lectured at the University of Malaya in the Division of Public Administration, obtaining his full professorship in 1992.

As an expert in international relations, he was considered an authority on the subject in Southeast Asia. He was instrumental in bringing prominent international academics from the United States, Japan, China and Australia to interact with their Malaysian counterparts at the institutions where he worked. In his later years, he devoted much of his time to the study of China-Malaysia relations at the Institute of China Studies in the University of Malaya. He was a rigorous, theoretically-informed analyst who consistently lifted the quality of policy deliberation in Malaysia and Southeast Asia.

Lee was president of the Malaysian Association of Japanese Studies (MAJAS) from 1998 to 2014, and was also the chairman for the Malaysian-American Commission on Educational Exchange (MACEE) in the years 2001 and 2003.

Awards 
In 2010, he was granted the Order of the Rising Sun by the Emperor of Japan in recognition of his important research on Japan's foreign relations. He was presented the award by the Japanese Ambassador to Malaysia at the time, Masahiko Horie.

Personal life 
Lee died at the University Malaya Medical Centre on November 21, 2016 after a fall. He was still associated with the University of Malaya at the time of his passing, holding the position of Senior Research Fellow at the Institute of China Studies.

Key Publications

References

External links 
Institute of China Studies
Malaysian-American Commission on Educational Exchange (MACEE)

2016 deaths
1942 births
People from Ipoh
People from Perak
University of Malaya alumni
Academic staff of the University of Malaya
Academic staff of the National University of Malaysia
National University of Malaysia alumni
Cornell University alumni
Malaysian political scientists
Recipients of the Order of the Rising Sun
Recipients of the Order of the Rising Sun, 3rd class
Malaysian people of Chinese descent
Malaysian people of Hakka descent
20th-century Malaysian historians
Historians of Southeast Asia
21st-century Malaysian historians